Marita Petersen (née Johansen; 21 October 1940 – 26 August 2001) was the first and to date only female Prime Minister of the Faroe Islands and the first female speaker of the Løgting (Parliament). She was elected to the Løgting in 1988 for Javnaðarflokkurin (The Social Democratic Party).
In January 1993, she was elected to the post of Prime Minister which she held until September 1994. Later, she became chairman of the parliament from 1994 to 1995. She was Prime Minister of the Faroe Islands in a very difficult time with economic crisis. Marita Petersen died of cancer in 2001.

Career

Early life 
Petersen was born in Vágur. She was educated at the Hellerup seminarium in Denmark, and trained as a teacher in 1964. She worked as a teacher in Copenhagen and Esbjerg from 1964 to 1967, in Tórshavnar kommunuskúli (one of the public schools in Tórshavn) from 1967 to 1989. From 1989 to 1994 she was leader of the teaching department of Landsskúlafyrisitingin 1989–94, leader of the Sernámsfrøðiliga ráðgevingin 1994-98 and from 1998 until her death she was manager for the Sernámsdepilin, which is a school for children with mentally disabilities.

Political career 
1994-1995 Speaker of the Løgting
1993-1994 Prime Minister (løgmaður) (the first and until now the only female Prime Minister of the Faroe Islands)
1994-1996 Leader of Javnaðarflokkurin (the Socialist Party)
1991-1993 Minister of Cultural Affairs
1988-1998 Member of the Faroese Løgting, except for the periods when she was prime minister or minister

References 

Prime Ministers of the Faroe Islands
Members of the Løgting
Female heads of government
1940 births
2001 deaths
Social Democratic Party (Faroe Islands) politicians
Speakers of the Løgting
Ministers of Culture of the Faroe Islands
People from Vágur
20th-century women politicians
Women government ministers of the Faroe Islands
Deaths from cancer in the Faroe Islands
Faroese schoolteachers
Women legislative speakers